The Nationwide Football Annual is a compact British football reference book which is produced at the start of each football season. It contains information from the previous football season, and also contains updated records going back to the beginnings of organised football in the 1800s.

This publication first appeared in 1887, produced by the Athletic News as a rival to the Football Annual.  Like the older publication, it initially aimed to provided coverage of all football codes popular in England, including rugby football (both rugby union and rugby league after the codes split) in addition to association football.

The titles of this publication have been:-
 1887-88 to 1889-90 : Athletic News Football Supplement & Club Directory
 1890-91 to 1945-46 : Athletic News Football Annual
 1946-47 to 1955-56 : Sunday Chronicle Football Annual
 1956-57 to 1960-61 : Empire News & Sunday Chronicle Football Annual
 1961-62 to 1964-65 : News of the World & Empire News Football Annual
 1965-66 to 2007-08 : News of the World Football Annual
 2008-09 to present : Nationwide Football Annual

Two long-serving previous editors were 'Tityrus' (otherwise J A H Catton, editor of the Athletic News 1900–1924) and Ivan Sharpe (c. 1928–1956). Other editors or joint-editors appearing on the front covers or title pages include 
David Jack (1956–1958 – he also made later contributions, not to be confused with the England footballer of the same name); Malcolm Gunn (1958–1966); Frank Butler (1961–1982); Patrick Collins (1967–1977); Harold Mayes (1978); Charles Sampson (1983–1984); Albert Sewell (1983–1997); Bill Bateson (1985–1994) and Eric Brown (1998–1999).

The book has incorporated a number of illustrations for many years, and since 1948 these have regularly included team photos of a few of the previous season's most successful sides.  Since 1985 the annual has also included very brief obituaries ('The Final Whistle') for selected former players and officials dying within the previous twelve months.

Following the withdrawal of News of the World as sponsors, the Nationwide Building Society emerged to provide new sponsorship in 2008. This sponsorship lasted for two years, with the title Nationwide Football Annual being retained after the end of the sponsorship.

Facsimile copies of the Athletic News Football Annuals for 1887-88 to 1900-01 and 1915-16 to 1918-19, were produced by the Association of Football Statisticians during the 1980s.

Details

Editions produced since 1946:-

See also
 Football Annual (a similar reference work, in existence from 1868 to 1908)
 The Football Yearbook (a similar reference work, in existence from 1970 to the present)

References

Association football books
Sports reference works